The 1922 All-Big Ten Conference football team consists of American football players selected to the All-Big Ten Conference teams chosen by various selectors for the 1922 Big Ten Conference football season.

Ends
 Bernard Kirk, Michigan (CON [29/50]; CA; CJ-1; CP; CT-1; PA-1; WE-1)
 Gus Tebell, Wisconsin (CJ-1; CP; CT-1; PA-1; WE-1)
 Paul G. Goebel, Michigan (CON; CJ-2; CT-2; PA-2; WE-2)
 Max Kadesky, Iowa (CA; CJ-2; CT-3; PA-2; WE-2)
 Frank Hanny, Indiana (CT-2)
 Otto Strohmeier, Chicago (CJ-3)
 Ray Eklund, Minnesota (CJ-3; WE-3)
 Leo V. Scherer, Nebraska (WE-3)
 David D. Wilson, Illinois (CT-3)

Tackles
 Marty Below, Wisconsin (CON; CA; CJ-2; CP; CT-1; PA-1; WE-1)
 Harold Fletcher, Chicago (CJ-1; CT-1; WE-3)
 Henry D. Penfield, Northwestern (CON [31/50]; CA; CJ-2; PA-1; WE-3)
 Stanley Muirhead, Michigan (CJ-1; CT-2; WE-2)
 Raymond Weller, Nebraska (WE-1)
 George Thompson, Iowa (WE-2; CJ-3; CP)
 Louis Gross, Minnesota (CT-2)
 Frank Gowdy, Chicago (CJ-3)
 George Abramson, Minnesota (CT-3)
 Ed Vandervoort, Michigan (CT-3)

Guards
 Jim McMillen, Illinois (CON [42/50]; CA; CJ-2; CP; CT-1; PA-1; WE-1)
 Paul Minick, Iowa (CON; CA; CJ-1; CP; PA-1; WE-2)
 Lloyd Pixley, Ohio State (CJ-1; CT-1; PA-2; WE-3)
 Ed Degree, Notre Dame (WE-1)
 Rudolph Hohfield, Wisconsin (CJ-2; CT-2)
 Ray Hahn, Kansas State (WE-2)
 Chester Mead, Iowa (CT-2)
 Harold Lewis, Chicago (PA-2)
 Joe Pondelik, Chicago (CJ-3; WE-3)
 Leo Kriz, Iowa (CJ-3)
 Edward Slaughter, Michigan (CT-3)
 Harold Steele, Michigan (CT-3)

Centers
 Ralph King, Chicago (CJ-3; CP; CT-2; PA-1; WE-1)
 John C. Heldt, Iowa (CJ-1; CT-1; WE-2)
 Oliver S. Aas, Minnesota (CON [19/50]; CA; CJ-2; CT-3; PA-2; WE-3)

Quarterbacks
 Rollie Williams, Wisconsin (CON [hb]; CJ-1 [hb]; CT-1 [hb]; PA-1; WE-1)
 Irwin Uteritz, Michigan (CJ-2; CP; CT-1; PA-2; WE-2)
 Wallace Barr, Wisconsin (CT-2)
 Leland Parkin, Iowa (CJ-3; CT-3)
 Dunn, Marquette (WE-3)

Halfbacks
 Harry Kipke, Michigan (CON; CA; CJ-1; CP; CT-1; PA-1; WE-1)
 Earl Martineau, Minnesota (CA; CJ-2; CP; CT-2; PA-1; WE-1)
 Hoge Workman, Ohio State (CJ-2; CT-2)
 Jackson Keefer, Michigan (CT-2)
 Otis C. McCreery, Minnesota (CT-2)
 Bill Boelter, Drake (WE-2)
 Jimmy Pyott, Chicago (CJ-3; PA-2; WE-2)
 Charles W. Palmer, Northwestern (CJ-3; WE-3)
 V. Craven Shuttleworth, Iowa (WE-3)

Fullbacks
 Gordon Locke, Iowa (CON [46/50] [qb]; CA [qb]; CJ-1 [qb]; CP [fullback]; CT-1 [fullback]; PA-1 [fullback]; WE-1 [fullback])
 John Webster Thomas, Chicago (CON; CA; CJ-1; CT-2; PA-2)
 Willis Zorn, Chicago (CJ-2)
 Franklin Cappon, Michigan (CJ-3; CT-3; PA-2 [halfback]; WE-2)
 Harold S. Hartley, Nebraska (WE-3)

See also
 1922 College Football All-America Team

Key

CON = Consensus based on compiling votes from 50 sports editors who selected teams

CA = Chicago American

CJ = selected by Norman Ross of the Chicago Evening Journal

CP = Chicago Post

CT = Capital Times selected by Bryn Griffiths

PA = The Pantagraph of Bloomington, Illinois

WE = Walter Eckersall in the Chicago Tribune

Bold = Consensus first-team selection of the majority of selectors listed above

References

1922 Big Ten Conference football season
All-Big Ten Conference football teams